Anna Louise "Ann" Aldrich (June 28, 1927 – May 2, 2010) was a United States district judge of the United States District Court for the Northern District of Ohio.

Education and career

Born in Providence, Rhode Island, Aldrich received a Bachelor of Arts degree from Columbia University in 1948 and a Bachelor of Laws from the New York University School of Law in 1950. She also attended the Graduate Institute of International Studies in 1951. She was an attorney on the General Counsel's Staff for the International Bank for Reconstruction and Development, in Washington, D.C., from 1951 to 1952. She served as a research assistant for Professor Edmond N. Cahn of the New York University School of Law from 1952 to 1953, and for Arthur T. Vanderbilt of the New Jersey Supreme Court from 1952 to 1953. After a brief stint in private practice in Washington, D.C., she served as a civilian attorney at Subic Bay Naval Station from 1954 to 1956, and as an attorney for the Federal Communications Commission from 1953 to 1960. Aldrich returned to private practice in Darien, Connecticut, from 1961 to 1968. In 1965, she argued for the plaintiff in United Church of Christ v. Federal Communications Commission, which established a private party's standing, before the Federal Communications Commission, to intervene in license renewal proceedings. Aldrich returned to New York University to earn a Master of Laws in 1964 and a Doctor of Juridical Science (a research degree in law equivalent to a Doctor of Philosophy) in 1967. She was a Professor of Law at Cleveland State University from 1968 to 1980.

Federal judicial service

Aldrich was nominated to the United States District Court for the Northern District of Ohio by President Jimmy Carter on March 28, 1980, to a new seat created by 92 Stat. 1629. She was confirmed by the United States Senate on May 21, 1980, and received her commission on May 24, 1980. Aldrich was the first woman appointed to the federal district court in Ohio. She assumed senior status on May 12, 1995, but remained active on the court until her death on May 2, 2010, in Cleveland, Ohio.

See also
List of first women lawyers and judges in Ohio

References

Sources
 

1927 births
2010 deaths
Ohio lawyers
Columbia University alumni
New York University School of Law alumni
Graduate Institute of International and Development Studies alumni
Cleveland State University faculty
Judges of the United States District Court for the Northern District of Ohio
United States district court judges appointed by Jimmy Carter
20th-century American judges
American expatriates in Switzerland
Lawyers from Providence, Rhode Island
20th-century American women judges